Leirion Gaylor Baird is an American politician. Since the 2019 election, she has been the mayor of Lincoln, Nebraska, where she previously served as a city councilwoman.

Early life and education 
Gaylor Baird grew up in Portland, Oregon; her parents were public school teachers. She completed a Bachelor of Arts in history from Yale College in 1993. She earned a Master of Science in comparative social policy from University of Oxford in 1997.

Career 
Baird began her career as a management consultant, working also as a city budget and policy analyst. She was the director of an after-school and summer program in San Francisco. Upon moving to Lincoln, Nebraska, she was appointed to the Lincoln/Lancaster County Planning Commission and helped develop its 2040 Comprehensive Plan. She was elected to the Lincoln City Council as a city-wide representative in May 2013 and was, at the time, its only female member. She won reelection in 2017.

Following the ratification of a term limit amendment by referendum, Baird announced her intention to succeed incumbent three-term Mayor Chris Beutler. Affiliated with the Democratic Party, she officially ran as a nonpartisan candidate due to municipal election law. She won the election for mayor on May 7, 2019, against Republican-affiliated Cyndi Lamm. She was sworn in on May 20, 2019, alongside the new city council.

Political positions and mayoralty 
During her campaign for the mayoralty, Baird campaigned on additional road funding for the city, environmental preservation, and community land trusts for housing. During her time as a city councilwoman, she introduced legislation to ban bump stocks in the city.

A recall against Baird was organized in October 2020. LNK Recall objected to the suspension of city charter rules that allowed Pat Lopez to be designated as health director. Organizers needed at least 21,652 signatures by December 23, 2020, to trigger a recall; they were unable to do so. Baird responded by saying she continued to work as mayor.

In November 2022, Baird announced her re-election campaign for the 2023 mayoral election. Primary opponents include Republican state senator Suzanne Geist and Republican former football player Stan Parker.

Election results

References 

21st-century American women politicians
21st-century American politicians
Alumni of the University of Oxford
Living people
Mayors of Lincoln, Nebraska
Nebraska city council members
Nebraska Democrats
Place of birth missing (living people)
Women mayors of places in Nebraska
Yale College alumni
Year of birth missing (living people)
Women city councillors in Nebraska